Frontier Romance is a 1929 MGM short silent film short in two-color Technicolor. It was the twelfth and final film produced as part of Metro-Goldwyn-Mayer's "Great Events" series. A romantic historical drama, the film depicts George Rogers Clark and other American colonists as they interact with Native American tribespeople.

Production
The film was shot at the Tec-Art Studio in Hollywood.

Preservation Status
Frontier Romance is believed to be lost.

References

External links 

1929 films
American silent short films
Films directed by Elmer Clifton
Metro-Goldwyn-Mayer short films
Silent films in color
Lost American films
1920s American films